Julian Knowle and Nenad Zimonjić were the defending champions, but lost in the semifinals this year.

Arnaud Clément and Michaël Llodra won the title, defeating Dominik Hrbatý and Jaroslav Levinský 6–3, 6–2 in the final.

Seeds

Draw

Draw

External links
Draw

St. Petersburg Open
2004 ATP Tour
2004 in Russian tennis